The Siribhoovalaya is a work of multi-lingual literature written by Kumudendu Muni, a Jain monk. The work is unique in that it employs not letters, but is composed entirely in Kannada numerals. The Saangathya metre of Kannada poetry is employed in the work. It uses numerals 1 through 64 and employs various patterns or bandhas in a frame of 729 (27×27) squares to represent alphabets in nearly 18 scripts and over 700 languages.

Author
The work is attributed to Jain monk Kumudendu Muni. He claims that he was guru of Amoghavarsha of Manyakheta and a disciple of virasena and jinasena of Dhavala. However, not much is known about this monk. Scholars are divided about when he lived. Karlamangalam Srikantaiah, the editor of the first edition, claims that the work may have been composed around 800 AD. Dr Venkatachala Sastry, however, dates him and his work to the 15th century. He also claims that Kumudendu Muni belonged to a village called Yalavalli near Nandidurga in Chikkaballapura Taluk in Kolar district. He further dates the work to around the 1550-1600 period and suggests it might be even more recent.

The Work

The work is said to have around 600,000 verses, nearly 6 times as big as the ancient Indian epic Mahabharata. In total, there are 26 chapters constituting a very large volume of text, of which only three have been decoded.

Coverage

The author expounds on many philosophies which existed in the Jain classics, which are eloquently and skillfully interpreted in the work.

It is also believed to contain valuable information about various sciences including  mathematics, chemistry, physics, astronomy, medicine, history, etc. Karlamangalam Srikantaiah, the editor of the first edition, has claimed that the work contains instructions for travel in water and space travel. It is also said that the work contains information about the production of modern weapons.

It is also claimed to consist of works in several languages including Sanskrit, Marathi, Telugu, Tamil,  Prakrit, etc., apart from Kannada. Different languages can be realised by assigning different alphabets to different numbers.

Codification
Some of the patterns used include the Chakrabandha, Hamsabandha, Varapadmabandha, Sagarabandha, Sarasabandha, Kruanchabandha, Mayurabandha, Ramapadabandha, Nakhabandha, etc. As each of these patterns are identified and decoded, the contents can be read.

Though written in Kannada, its numerical encipherment enables speakers of other languages to also comprehend it.

Challenges

There are 16,000 chakras in all. Out of which only 1,270 chakras are available. There are 9 khandas in all. The available 1,270 chakras belong to Prathama khanda, called Mangala Prabhruta. (This is only a syllabus of the Siri Bhoovalaya, which contains 59 chapters). The remaining 8 khandas of work not available. The number of letters (in the form of numerals) used are 14 lakhs (140,000). It has been claimed that it is possible to decipher 6 lakh Shlokas or verses.

Since no contemporary pandit is conversant with the esoteric metres employed in the work, the work of deciphering is being done with the help of computers. The whereabouts of remaining (16,000 - 1,270) = 14,730 chakras are not known.

Reactions
S. Srikanta Sastri, a respected name in the study of Indian history and culture, has commented on the work thus,

References

External links
"सिरि  भूवलय" : वेब-साईट परियोजना
Introduction to Siri Bhoovalaya
A project attempting to demonstrate Siri Bhoovalaya technique

Jain texts
Eastern philosophical literature
Kannada literature
Indian poetics
History of literature in India
Epic poems
Epic poems in Kannada
S